is a Japanese manga series created by Suzuhito Yasuda that began publishing by Kodansha in 2006, and was then published in the US by Del Rey in 2008. The anime adaptation aired from October 2 to December 18, 2008 in Japan and comprised 12 episodes. The series was produced by Nomad and aired on TBS on Thursdays. Three anime OVAs (original-video-animation) were released alongside volume 9-11 of the manga, between October 10, 2010 to November 9, 2011. A new anime adaptation of the series aired in 2013, with the cast returning from the first anime and OVAs, it was produced at Tatsunoko Productions. Another set of OVAs, adapting the Tsuki ni Naku arc (volume 11 of the manga), was released with the special editions of volumes 14-16.

Yozakura Quartet is Suzuhito Yasuda's first manga. Before the creation of Yozakura Quartet, he was an illustrator. He drew the original character designs for Yoshikazu Kuwashima's series Kamisama Kazoku and Ryohgo Narita's Durarara!!.

Story
The story revolves around four teenagers; Hime, Akina, Ao, and Kotoha; each of them having their own unique abilities. They run an office called Hiizumi Life Counseling Office, where their job is to help and protect the townspeople of Sakurashin, a town where humans and youkai co-exist. The town is protected by a barrier created by the spiritual sakura known as The Seven Pillars. The Seven Pillars exist in both the human world and the youkai world and is the only thing that keeps both worlds connected to each other. However, recent bizarre incidents have occurred in their town and someone has threatened its safety. It is up to the four of them to protect the town they love.

Characters

The main protagonist who is a sixteen-year-old high school girl with supernatural powers, in the anime she is believed to be the reincarnation of an ancient dragon. She assumed the role of mayor of the city when she was a child after her grandmother was "tuned" by Akina's grandfather. She treasures her long scarf which was made by Akina. Her scarf was made to cover up her scar on her neck which was made by Yae Shinatsuhiko to seal most of Hime's youkai power. All of the townspeople including her friends had their memory of Hime being a youkai sealed because when she was a child, she asked Yae to seal the memory so she can have a better perspective from a human's point of view and a youkai's point of view. In chapter thirteen, everyone's memory of her being a youkai have returned when a group who is running against Hime's little cousin, Kohime, was running as mayor in another town, wanted her to drop out of the election and Hime to give her position to their leader by threatening them with a barrier that weakens all the youkai to a point that can be life threatening. Because of this Yae had no choice but to weaken the barrier that they made, which in turn returned everyone's memory. Hime happens to be a glutton and loves to eat noodles, especially those cooked by Akina. She is also quite sensitive about her weight; she trains using the teachings her grandmother taught her and patrols the town everyday. Hime uses her grandmother's teachings in the hopes that she will become a great mayor like her grandmother once was. She may appear harsh at times, but she has a kind heart. She often uses improvised staves like a Lacrosse racket as her weapons. She has a crush on Akina, and was friends with Gin during their childhood.

An eighteen-year-old young man in the employment of the city. He is the director of the Hiizumi Life Counseling Office and the only human who works there. He is able to perform "tuning"; an ability that can send back youkai to their world and cut off their connection to the human world. This ability can only be used by his family; the one who succeeds this ability is called oyakume. His hair grows longer whenever he uses his ability. Because of this ability, some of the youkai view the oyakume as murderers. Akina reveals that he can use the ability in chapter eight of the manga, although (as of volume 4) he tells everyone that he tuned Gin before the start of the series. According to him, the final destiny of the oyakume is to be tuned by his successor in order to maintain the balance between the human and youkai worlds, and just as he had to tune his grandfather who was the previous oyakume, he will be tuned by the next oyakume when the time comes for him to take over his position.

A fifteen-year-old female Satori who helps run the office and is the announcer of the town as well. She has cat ears that she uses as antennas, which she usually hides with a hat or headphones, and has the ability to read people's thoughts; she can talk to animals using this ability as well. Not only can she do both of these tasks, but she can also sense an opponents next move. She has a stronger version called "Satellite," which can read the thoughts of everyone in the city at once, though this drains a lot of her energy. Ao happens to be a glutton like Hime but doesn't indulge very often. She has an elder brother named Gin, who went missing before the series started and is later revealed to be Enjin's vessel.

A sixteen-year-old high school student who was once a human before she was possessed by a youkai at a very young age and because of that event she became a Hanyou, half youkai and half human. She is a Language-user (Kotodama tsukai) who can summon things when she emphasizes words. Kotoha found out recently that she is actually a rare type of conjurer that can make anything come to life including passages in books. She can conjure up weapons or objects by saying one word, however there are certain objects where she needs to use a lengthy spell in order to conjure it up. She is also a gun nut which is shown in the first chapter of the manga. She once went on a vacation to Germany just to visit the Koblenz Museum of Military Technology, because of the tanks and weapons which were on display there. Kotoha is also known to be a great singer by her friends. She admits to being a lesbian in chapter ten of the manga. This is more evident when all the other characters except Gin attend the party. Even though she wears glasses, she has said they are just for decoration. When she's mad, Kotoha tends to go a bit overboard in her fights. One example of this is when Hime made Kotoha become her training partner and during the training, she accidentally destroys her plane ticket to Germany. At this, Kotoha conjures up an Acht, a German army's 88mm FlaK (model 1936) cannon and fires at Hime. After her friends stop her from using the Acht, she noticed the damage she did and apologized for what she did. If she overuses her power, she can lose her voice for a while, Her power is vast but the more powerful the exact conjuration the more she taxes herself and she will eventually run out of stamina passing out to sleep. Her last name is an alternate reading of the word "gojuon", an ordering for hiragana, which is a play off of her abilities.

The main antagonist of the series. Enjin was a member of the branch family of the Hiizumi household. He was tuned along his relatives by the main branch centuries before and returns as a non-physical entity possessing the body of Ao's older brother Gin. To enact revenge at the city, Enjin intends to force the seven pillars to bloom in an attempt to fuse the human and Youkai dimensions. Aside from Gin's Satori powers, Enjin's true power is "Striking" which is the opposite of Akina's Tuning, summoning objects from the Youkai world instead. but after learning Exorcism powers, Enjin removes the limitations of his Striking, thus using it does not take a toll over his body just like Akina. Enjin later reveals that he can also perform "Tuning" as well, but at a much smaller potential than Akina.

An eighteen-year-old man who is an assistant to Hime. He is an oni (ogre in English dub) with superhuman strength, but wears a seal that looks like a bracelet around his left wrist. The seal works through the 'Placebo Effect' where as long as he remembers he is an oni, the seal will work. When he takes it off his horns appear revealing his powers. He appears to be harsh towards Akina sometimes because he believes at first that the youkai in the human world are suffering because Akina did not succeed as oyakume, until Akina reveals that he in fact did it. Akina is a childhood friend of Kyōsuke and usually makes fun of him by saying that he has a sister complex, which usually ends up with the two fighting. Later it is revealed that both Kyōsuke and his sister were not given birth like humans and youkais, but originated from the collective imagination of those who had spread the legend of the oni for thousands of years instead.

A sixteen-year-old high school student who is Kyōsuke's little sister. She is also an employee of Hiizumi Life Counseling. Just like her brother, she is a youkai with superhuman strength. She has a crush on Akina, which Kyōsuke is not pleased with it. Unlike her brother, she can not completely control her strength even with a seal, since she sometimes forgets that she is an oni.

A fifteen-year-old jiangshi (reanimated corpse) who recently moved to the city. She was hunted by humans until she met Zakuro, a necromancer who became her first friend. She doesn't need to sleep, as long as she wears her name tag although she does wear her Jiangshi tag every morning as a wake-up call but without the tags she is little more than a human corpse and can not move. Rin says that she hates the starry sky, having been on the run for so long with no roof to sleep under, and staying outside during the night began to cause her fear. Due to being constantly bullied by her human classmates during childhood, she loathed humans until being saved by Akina. She now works in a delivery store.

Rin's first friend and the first demon hunter who made an attack on Sakurashin. Zakuro is a necromancer and is capable of controlling anything that was once living, but is now dead, along with other yokai. Being able to do this allows Zakuro to also control Rin's movements, whether or not she has her name tag on. After the fight, when Zakuro entered the town, and also began working in the same delivery store as Rin, Zakuro was extremely fearful of being banished from the city and not being able to join. This fear continued on, even after she was officially made part of the population of Sakurashin.

He appears as a young boy, however he is really much older; He has been watching over Sakurashin for over 200 years and is the District Mayor. He is a Land God with great power, enough where Enjin and his associates fear him. In episode 7 of the anime, he claims he fancies Rin. He seems to be something of a womanizer, as in the same episode, he is told on many occasions that he is only to look at the women of the festival by Mariabelle and Yae. He is also called by his sister as the God of Woman. His hobbies is making Mariabelle cosplay for him. Even though he is a land god, as explained in chapter 38, it's his sister who wields the title of land goddess of Sakurashin, since she was the first one to take root in town, and according to him there can only be one land god in each place. Instead, he became Mariabelle's protector god, as he states that 'gods do not only protect land'.While during the Walking Pilgrimage arc, Yuhi kept his smaller form due to the fact he did not have enough power from not taking root at a particular land, he now maintains the form for Mariabelle's sake (who thinks it's cute). However, when he goes on official rounds, he prefers a taller, older form, which upsets Mariabelle (though he changed back to his smaller form when he noticed she was upset in Chapter 45, though only because it was in Sakurashin). It is lightly implied that he was the land god for Sakurashin before Yae.

The District Mayor's assistant, which makes her Yuhi's assistant. She is an immortal human. The walking pilgrimage arc tells the story of how she became acquaintance with Yuhi. 200 years ago, Mariabelle once died from a deadly disease but her father (Victor Frankenstein) resurrected her and use her body as a basis to make a cure for the disease to save her brother and her village. Now an immortal and a living dead, she and her father traveled to Sakurahin to have her tuned to prevent other half youkais who seeks her immortality but Yuhi persuaded them not to, and becomes his root. As a sign of gratitude for saving her life, Mariabelle became Yuhi's assistant. She is always seen in various cosplay outfit due to Yuhi, though not unwillingly (as it is shown in later chapters that she enjoys it). She likes to eat Japanese food for breakfast and gets mad if she doesn't. She thinks that Yuhi's younger form is cute, and dislikes it whenever he changes into his larger, more suave form.

Yae is Yuhi's younger sister, as she calls him "aniki", or older brother. She is the land goddess of Sakurashin and is usually shown dressed as a nun who wields two Katana swords beside her waist. She can easily cut a car in half using a technique called Spring Wind (名東風 Haru Kaze). She appears to be fond of bears and plush toys, to the point that she wore a bear costume helmet given by Hime to stop a robbery. Yae was created hundreds of years before the Walking Pilgrimage arc by her brother Yuhi to be the land god for Sakurashin, however her insistence to follow her brother led her to travelling with him until the arc when she willingly took root and become the land god for the exact land she had been intended to take over.

A nurse who runs a clinic in Sakurashin. She has her own TV show called the Juri Channel. She appears to have superhuman strength, however she is really a human. Akina comes by to her clinic to get himself check over because of his tuning ability and can "re-tune" him just by holding his hand, but she stated that anyone from the human world can do it. Juri used to be an assistant for Hime when Hime was a child and had finally become mayor of Sakurashin. The V and F in her name stands for "Victor Frankenstein", the name of her ancestor and Mariabelle's father making her Mariabelle's great-grandniece as Juri is a descendant of Mariabelle's brother. When Juri first came to Sakurashin, she had been obsessed with growing up and making people hear what she had to say about her ancestor, but after meeting Hime's grandmother and having a sparring session with her, Juri realizes the importance of enjoying and learning during her childhood. Juri's parents are currently living in England, and she keeps in touch with them through letter and reading her mother's blog.

 
Juri's younger sister, and an extremely talented magician. She can make it appear that her heart has stopped, which allowed her to fake her own death, causing her entire family to think she was dead, while, in the meantime, she became a yokai hunter. Lila held a resentment for Juri, since while Juri was studying to become a doctor, she stopped paying much attention to Lila, causing her to find new ways to try to get Juri away from her books. Her main attempt was by showing her the newest magic tricks that she had perfected, however this was rather unsuccessful. Just like Zakuro, Lila eventually reforms after reconciling with her sister and becomes her assistant at the hospital.

Hime's nine-year-old younger cousin. She attempted to run for mayor in a neighboring town, but was too young for it.

Media

Manga

In July 2004, Suzuhito Yasuda was supposed to illustrate a demon manga series with someone else scripting the story, but his editor suggested that he should create an original series. In January 2005, Yasuda came up with a series called Glorious Life, a prototype for Yozakura Quartet. It was set in Sakurashin just like Yozakura Quartet, however the editor-in-chief shot it down. His editor suggested three girls and a boy as the main characters and that they could be demon hunters for hire. His editor commented that he wanted to make something similar to Charlie's Angels, which in August 2005 turned out as Yozakura Falsetto. However this too was shot down by his editor. He was told that he had a last chance to fix the series and in October 2005, his story was finally accepted. His editor told him he should change the title of his series though because it was too hard for their readers to understand, and suggested Yozakura Quartet instead of Yozakura Falsetto. The series finally began serialization in January 2006. A crossover manga with Durarara!!, titled YZQ ✕ DRRR!!, was released with the limited edition Blu-Ray of Yozakura Quartet ~Hana no Uta~ in December 2013.

The manga was originally licensed in the United States and Canada by Del Rey Manga, however publication of the series ceased after five tankōbon volumes were released due to Del Rey Manga's closure. Kodansha USA resumed publication of the manga in English as a digital-only series in August 2016.

Anime

An anime adaption of the manga aired on TBS in October 2008. The anime was produced by Nomad. The anime has been licensed in North America by Sentai Filmworks and 
is distributed by Section23 Films. The complete collection was released March 2, 2010.
On March 23, 2010, manga creator Suzuhito Yasuda announced that a new anime adaption that will start in October coinciding with the ninth volume of the manga. The cast from the first series returned for this series. The first OAV shipped on October 8. A second episode was released along with the 10th volume on April 8, 2011 and the third with the 11th on September 9, 2011.
On April 4, 2013, it was announced that another three episode OAV, Yozakura Quartet ~Tsuki ni Naku~, is in the works and will be released with the limited edition volumes of the 14th, 15th, and 16th volumes of the manga. They were released on September 9, 2013, February 7, 2014 and November 7, 2014. Also on April 4, 2013, it was announced that Yozakura Quartet will get a new TV anime adaptation as well, animated by Tatsunoko Production. On April 9, 2013, the title was confirmed as Yozakura Quartet ~Hana no Uta~. On April 11, 2013, it was confirmed that Yozakura Quartet ~Hana no Uta~ will feature the same cast as the first series, and will not be a continuation from the first series, but rather, a complete new series on its own. It aired 13 episodes between October 6, 2013 and January 1, 2014.

References

External links
 Official Site 
 Yozakura Quartet ~Hana no Uta~ Anime official site 
 Yozakura Quartet Anime at TBS website 
 

2006 manga
2008 anime television series debuts
2010 anime OVAs
2013 anime OVAs
2013 anime television series debuts
2013 manga
Action anime and manga
Del Rey Manga
Nomad (company)
Sentai Filmworks
Shōnen manga
Supernatural anime and manga
Tatsunoko Production
Yōkai in anime and manga